The Cactus and Succulent Society of America (CSSA) is a horticultural society which is based in 	Claremont, California.

History
The CSSA was founded in 1929 in Los Angeles County, at Pasadena, California and has grown to encompass over 80 affiliated clubs and thousands of members worldwide. The primary purpose of the society is to enjoy succulent (water-storing) plants through horticulture, travel and scientific discovery, with a particular concern for habitat preservation and conservation issues in deserts worldwide.

It is a non-profit tax-exempt organisation.

Objectives
The Society supports the cactus and succulent community, both amateur and professional, through education, conservation, scientific research, and research grants.

Activities
The Society undertakes a range of activities to achieve its objectives:
 Publishes The Cactus and Succulent Society Journal, quarterly and the society's more technical yearbook, Haseltonia.
 Organises an Annual Convention for members 
 Participates in a biennial International Convention
 Facilitates members-only Field Trips to native habitats of cacti and other succulents
 Organises sale of cactus and succulent seeds to members from the CSSA Seed Depot

References

Clubs and societies in the United States
Horticultural organizations based in the United States
Organizations established in 1929
Cacti of the United States